Dahuka boli (also "Dahuka gita" (ଡାହୁକ ଗୀତ)) are poetic recitations which Dahukas (or Ratha bhanda), the charioteer who recite during the Rath Yatra in Puri, Odisha. Ratha Yatra being a symbolic expression of fertility and Life cycle, these "boli" sung by the Dahuka contain bawdy songs. It is believed that unless the Dahuka boli is sung 'Ratha' doesn't move. These songs are sung publicly without any kind of hold on the lyrics. Dahuka controls the movement of Ratha during the festival. This tradition is the remnant of Vajrayana Buddhism in Odisha and the lyrics bear the signature of the Vajrayana Buddhist poetry. The Dahukas are believed to be the descends of the famous 84 Mahasiddhas.

Lyrics samples 

<ref name=TSI1>Asit Mohanty. ରଥେ ଭଣ୍ଡ ଡାକ ଡାକଇ ଡାହୁକହେ ଭଗତେ ହୋ. The Sunday Indian (In Oriya). July 20, 2011</ref>

 History 
"Dahuka boli" have many derivatives from Charyapada. One of the earliest Dahuka boli by Kanhapa is as follows:
ମାରି ଶାଶୁ ନଣନ୍ଦ ଘରେ ଶାଳୀ
ମାଅ ମାରିଆ କାହ୍ନୁ ଭଇଲ କବାଳୀ Roman transliteration:māri sāsu naṇanda gharē sāḷi 
māa māriā kāhnu bhaila kabāḷi 

In the "Swatwalipi or Adhikara abhilekha service no 104 there is the description of Dahuka and their service on "Ratha" There is no description of such service in "Purusottama mahatmya" in Skandha purana. But there are descriptions of "Dahuka" in Purusottama Karmangi.Purusottama Karmangi

 Text from Purusottama Karmangi 

The boli/dahuka boli were also called as "Tucha pada" (ତୁଚ୍ଛ ପଦ), "Bhanda gita" (ଭଣ୍ଡ ଗୀତ) or "Bakra gita" (ବକ୍ରଗୀତ). During the earlier 20th century Jagadeba Mishra, a poet from Puri has written about the "Dahuka boli" his book "Sahari jalam":

 Ban on Dahuka boli 
During 1995 The Jagannatha temple trustee officials banned the recitation of Dahuka boli. Apart from few exceptions since 1997, Dahukas never sung Dahuka gita.

 See also 
 Charyapada
 Rath Yatra
 Jagannatha

 References 

 External links 
 ପ୍ରାଚୀନ ଡାହୁକ ବୋଲି ବନ୍ଦ ହେବ କାହିଁକି? (In Odia). The Sunday Indian. July 18, 2011
 Mohanty, Dhrutikama‘ଡାହୁକ ବୋଲି'-ସତରେ କ'ଣ ଅଶ୍ଳୀଳ? '' (In Odia). The Sunday Indian. July 12, 2011

Odia culture
Jagannath
Indian songs